Get Out Alive: The Last Type Story is the fourth album from The Speaking Canaries, a Pittsburgh-based indie rock band.

Critical reception
Reviewing the long version, Tiny Mix Tapes wrote that [Damon] Che's "guitar playing [is] the protagonist in this particular tale, employing everything from chaotic six-string torture, to hacking and jittery math-rock, and all the way to pinch harmonics and back again, almost to the point of note-per-minute showoffery." Rolling Stone praised the "napalm riffing and glass-spear harmonics that tell you exactly what Husker Du would have sounded like with Eddie Van Halen and J Mascis on four-handed guitar."

Track listing
"I Wear Glasses in the Most Brutal Sport Ever Invented" - 2:55
"Menopause Diaries" - 4:47
"Last Type" - 4:29
"Coffin Jitters" - 3:29
"Last Side of Town part 2" - 6:04
"Life Like Homes" - 8:23
"Song on a Record You Can't Get" - 4:52
"Theme from Hospital Comedian" - 4:08

Personnel
The Speaking Canaries:
Damon Che - Guitars, vocals, drums, bass, percussion, glockenspiel, recording engineer
Noah Leger - drums on half (lower in the mix will be a sure indication. Liner notes are incorrect).
Jon Purse - Bass on two songs
Ingrid - vocals on "Life Like Homes"
Al Sutton - Recording engineer, mixing engineer
Robert Ebeling - Mixing engineer
Todd Doehering - Recording engineer, mixing engineer

Get Out Alive: The Long Version
An alternate, longer version (76:02) of Get Out Alive was released by Scat Records on CD-R at the same time as the regular version.  Get Out Alive: The Long Version features extended versions of "Last Side of Town", "Last Type" and "Coffin Jitters" and adds the song "Stuffed With Fear".

References

2003 albums
Scat Records albums